Live: Manchester and Dublin is the first live album by Rodrigo y Gabriela, a Mexican guitar duo.

Critical reception
The album was given a positive review by The Guardian, saying "There's a wild streak to these recordings I've not heard in previous performances by Rodrigo y Gabriela, and it's very welcome. This is a World Music album that swings." It was also included in their list of 1,000 albums to hear before you die.

Track listing

Track 1 ends with a reference to the ending of "Fight Fire with Fire". Track 4 contains an excerpt of "Seven Nation Army". Track 5 contains an excerpt of "Master of Puppets". Track 5 contains an excerpt of "Mediterranean Sundance/Rio Ancho" (Al Di Meola/Paco De Lucia). Track 7 begins with an excerpt of "Dirty Window" and ends with references to "Of Wolf and Man" and live renditions of "Battery".
Track 8 has a 1-minute silence starting at 5:05; The reasoning behind this is unknown.

Tracks 1-4 recorded in Manchester, UK, at Manchester Academy 2 on 12 February 2004.
Tracks 5-8 recorded in Dublin, Ireland, at Christ Church Cathedral on 2 December 2003.

Personnel
Rodrigo y Gabriela
Rodrigo Sánchez – acoustic guitar
Gabriela Quintero – acoustic guitar

Additional performers
Zoë Conway – violin on tracks 5–8, vocals on track 8.
Ruth O'Leary – violin on tracks 7–8.

Production
Produced by Rodrigo y Gabriela
Live engineering by Graham Higgins
Mixed by Neil Causier and Colin Sullivan
Mastered by Robyn Robins
Video directed and edited by David O'Rourke
Video shot by O'Rourke, Mark Rubbathan, Craig Rubbathan, Dean Lochner, Conn Holohan
Cover concept by Rodrigo y Gabriela
Design and photography by Marcus Byrne
Live agent – Paul Wilson at CAA
Accountant – Anthony Casey
Management – Niall Muckian

References

Rodrigo y Gabriela albums
2004 live albums